|}

This is a list of electoral district results of the 1930 Western Australian election.

This election occurred after the first redistribution since the 1911 election, so the boundaries were greatly changed.

Results by Electoral district

Albany

Avon

Beverley

Boulder

Brownhill-Ivanhoe

Bunbury

Canning

Claremont

Collie

East Perth

Forrest

Fremantle

Gascoyne

Geraldton

Greenough

Guildford-Midland

Hannans

Irwin-Moore

Kalgoorlie

Kanowna

Katanning

Kimberley

Leederville 

|- style="background-color:#E9E9E9"
! colspan="6" style="text-align:left;" |After distribution of preferences

Maylands

Middle Swan

Mount Hawthorn

Mount Magnet

Mount Marshall

Murchison

Murray-Wellington

Nedlands

Nelson

North Perth

North-East Fremantle

Northam

Perth

Pilbara

Pingelly

Roebourne

South Fremantle

Subiaco

Sussex

Swan

Toodyay

Victoria Park

Wagin

West Perth

Williams-Narrogin

Yilgarn-Coolgardie

York

See also 

 1930 Western Australian state election
 Members of the Western Australian Legislative Assembly, 1930–1933

References 

Results of Western Australian elections
1930 elections in Australia